Simona Šoda (born October 24, 1974) is a former Croatian female professional basketball player. She began her coaching career in 2010.

External links
Profile at fibaeurope.com

1974 births
Living people
Basketball players from Šibenik
Croatian women's basketball players
Small forwards
Power forwards (basketball)
ŽKK Gospić players
ŽKK Šibenik players